Adiva Geffen (born 1946) is an Israeli writer and playwright.

Biography
Adiva Geffen was born in Haifa. She began her career as a special-ed teacher. After leaving the education field, she served as the spokesperson for the Habima National Theater  for more than a decade. Geffen lives in Tel Aviv  with her partner Aharon Meidan. Geffen has published 25 books, including children's stories, reference books and suspense novels. Her latest book "My Daughter’s Keeper" was published in 2022.

Published works

Novels
 Murder at First Reading
 Chicago Bypass
 Till Death Dances Between Us
 The Day Love Died
 Transparent Women
 Love Second Time Round
 Piccadilly South
 Panama Jack
 The World According to Mother
 Tarzan, Jane and the Dishwasher
 Diamond Dust
 Last Stop Arad
 A Shadow of an Angel
 She Was Not There
 Missing 
 Clara's Boys
 Surviving the forest 
 Matinée

Children books
 The new House of the Zebra Gayla
 The amazing story of the Zebra Gayla
 THE Angel of the Colors And His Assistants
 The Girl who Wanted to be a Princess

Plays
 Citron in the Falls
 Alice Lost & Found
 Costa Rica Dream
 Shameless Heirs
 Hurry, Hurry Songs - Children Songs by Miriam Yalan-Shteklis

References

External links
 Adiva-Geffen's Short Bio in English
 Adiva-Geffen at Modern Hebrew Literature - a Bio-Bibliographical Lexicon

1946 births
Living people
Israeli Jews
Jewish novelists
Israeli women children's writers
Israeli journalists
Israeli women journalists
Jewish women writers
Writers from Haifa
Israeli female dramatists and playwrights